Bematistes epiprotea, the insipid bematistes, is a butterfly in the family Nymphalidae. It is found in southern Nigeria, Cameroon, Gabon, the Republic of the Congo, the southern part of the Democratic Republic of the Congo, Sudan and western Tanzania.

Description

P. epiprotea  Btlr. (58 b) is distinguished by having the transverse band of the forewing placed far beyond the apex of the cell, so that it may be regarded rather as a subapical than a median band; it is straight, directed towards the hindmargin and posteriorly bounded by vein 3, in the male smoke-yellow and 4 mm. in breadth, in the female white and 7 mm. in breadth; in the male the basal part of the forewing to vein 3 is smoke-brown, but in the  female black-brown with a small white hindmarginal spot, which only reaches the fold of cellule 1 b, but is  continued on the hindwing as an indistinct median band to vein 2 or 3. In the male the hindwing is smoke-brown above, somewhat darker towards the distal margin. The under surface of the hindwing in both sexes is  smoke-grey to the base. Niger to the Congo.

Biology
The habitat consists of lowland forests.

The larvae feed on Barteria species.

Taxonomy
See Pierre & Bernaud, 2014

References

External links
Die Gross-Schmetterlinge der Erde 13: Die Afrikanischen Tagfalter. Plate XIII 58 b
Images representing Acraea epiprotea at Bold

Butterflies described in 1874
Acraeini
Butterflies of Africa
Taxa named by Arthur Gardiner Butler